Bay City Rollers, released in late 1975, was the first full-length album by Scotland's Bay City Rollers to be issued in the US and Canada.  The compilation, which hit No. 1 in the RPM Canadian album chart on 7 February 1976 and reached as high as No. 20 on the US album chart, included the US and Canadian #1 hit single "Saturday Night".

The LP contained tracks culled mostly from the band's first three UK-only albums: 5 songs from Rollin''', 4 songs from Once Upon a Star and 1 song from Wouldn't You Like It'' – along with 1 brand new song. In addition, this album contains the US mix of "Summerlove Sensation" (a much fuller mix with strings), which finally became available on CD on the US release "Definitive Collection".

Track listing 
 "Give a Little Love" (Johnny Goodison, Phil Wainman)
 "Bye Bye Baby" (Bob Crewe, Bob Gaudio)
 "Shang-a-Lang" (Bill Martin, Phil Coulter)
 "Marlena" (Eric Faulkner, Les McKeown, Stuart Wood)
 "Let's Go (A Huggin' And A Kissin' In The Moonlight)" (Goodison, Wainman)
 "Be My Baby" (Jeff Barry, Ellie Greenwich, Phil Spector)
 "Summerlove Sensation" (Martin, Coulter)
 "Remember (Sha-La-La-La)" (Martin, Coulter)
 "Saturday Night" (Martin, Coulter)
 "My Teenage Heart" (Faulkner, Wood)
 "Keep on Dancing" (Allen Jones, Willie David Young)

Charts

Weekly charts

Year-end charts

Personnel 
 Eric Faulkner – Guitar
 Alan Longmuir – Bass Guitar
 Derek Longmuir – Drums
 Les McKeown – Lead Vocals
 Stuart "Woody" Wood – Guitar

References 

Bay City Rollers albums
Albums produced by Phil Coulter
Albums produced by Bill Martin (musician)
Albums produced by Phil Wainman
1975 compilation albums
Arista Records compilation albums